Warren Vanders (born Warren John Vanderschuit; May 23, 1930 – November 27, 2009) was an American character actor on television and in films.

Biography

He was born in San Fernando, California, as Warren John Vanderschuit. Under the name Warren Vanders, he secured a recurring role as Chuck Davis in fifteen episodes of the NBC modern western television series, Empire. He also portrayed Roy Bean on the TV series Hell Town.

He guest starred in such series as Tate, The Big Valley (twice), The Fugitive (twice), Bonanza (five times between 1965-1971), Daniel Boone (eight times), Alias Smith and Jones (as Curly Red Johnson in "The Day the Amnesty Came Through"), The Waltons, Gunsmoke (twelve times), Combat! (twice), Kung Fu, Hawaii Five-O (1970, as Jase Gorman in the episode: The Payoff), The Rockford Files, and How the West Was Won. He appeared in such films as Nevada Smith with Steve McQueen, Hot Lead and Cold Feet, and in the John Wayne/Katharine Hepburn film Rooster Cogburn, in the role of Bagsby.

Quentin Tarantino named a character after him in Django Unchained.

He was also a boxer, winning the Los Angeles 1954 Golden Gloves Championship, and continued to box when he was in the United States Navy.

Vanders died on November 27, 2009, at Huntington Memorial Hospital in Pasadena, California, after having lung cancer. He was 79 years old.

Filmography

References 

The Los Angeles Times, December 7, 2009, "PASSINGS: Warren Vanderschuit..." .
New York Times, 2010, Sandra Brennan, "Warren Vanders" .

External links
 at the Los Angeles Times
 at the New York Times
 at the Internet Movie Database
 at MSN
 at Fandango

1930 births
2009 deaths
American male film actors
American male television actors
Deaths from lung cancer in California
People from San Fernando, California
20th-century American educators
Western (genre) television actors
20th-century American male actors